Skinny dipping is a colloquial term for nude swimming.

 "Skinny Dipping", a 2021 song by Sabrina Carpenter
 Skinny Dipping, a 2018 album by Stand Atlantic, or the title track featuring Alex Lahey

See also
 Skinny dip (disambiguation)